Tarwater is a German music duo comprising Bernd Jestram and Ronald Lippok. Tarwater have recorded several albums of mostly instrumental music usually tagged as post-rock.

History
Jestram and Lippok met in an East German punk rock band, and began recording together even while Lippok recorded with To Rococo Rot and Jestram worked in his Bleibeil studio. The first Tarwater album debuted with 1996's 11/6 12/10, released around the same time first album came about. Tarwater's second album, Silur, followed in 1998. The critical praise attendant on the latter earned Tarwater American distribution, with Animals Suns & Atoms appearing in 2000 and Dwellers on the Threshold in 2004. In 2005, the album The Needle Was Traveling appeared. It was their first album for the Morr label.

Discography

 11/6 12/10 (1996)
 Rabbit Moon (1997)
 Silur (1998)
 Rabbit Moon - Revisited (1998)
 Animals Suns & Atoms (2000)
 Not The Wheel (2001)
 Dwellers on the Threshold (2002)
 The Needle Was Traveling (2005)
 Japan Tour EP (2005)
 Spider Smile (2007)
 Inside the Ships (2011)
 Adrift (2014)

External links
 Official Tarwater website
 [ Tarwater] at Allmusic
 morr music

References

German musical groups
German post-rock groups
Kitty-Yo artists
Morr Music artists
Mute Records artists